Exile is a 1994 Australian drama film directed by Paul Cox. It was entered into the 44th Berlin International Film Festival. The film was shot entirely on location in Tasmania.

Plot
In the 19th century a young man is banished to an island for stealing a few sheep.

Cast
 Aden Young as Peter Costello
 Beth Champion as Mary
 Claudia Karvan as Jean
 Norman Kaye as Ghost Priest
 David Field as Timothy Dullach
 Chris Haywood as Village Priest
 Barry Otto as Sheriff Hamilton
 Hugo Weaving as Innes
 Tony Llewellyn-Jones as Jean's Father
 Nicholas Hope as MacKenzie
 Gosia Dobrowolska as Midwife

Production
The film is based on a novel which was set in Scotland but Cox relocated it to Tasmania. Although an earlier script was written by another writer, Cox wrote the screenplay for the film over eight days while on holiday on a Greek Island. Half the budget was provided by the Film Finance Corporation. According to Cinema Papers, the budget for the movie was AUD$2.0m, but director Paul Cox claimed it was actually AUD$1.5m.

The film was shot from 15 March to 25 April 1993 on the Freycinet Peninsula on the east coast of Tasmania. Cox:
It's a very religious film. Because of that, it is not very commercial, is not very successful. I think it's a very good film... Exile is about the sea. It's also about society, how it always destroys the individual: that we're not the end product of that society, we're just there to be manipulated and used. It's about a man kicked out of society who really becomes himself. He shines, burns through all the rubbish of the mind and the body. He has to somehow survive physically as well, and he does it quite brilliantly. People even get jealous of him. They ban him and exile him.

Exile had its Australian premiere at the State Cinema, North Hobart which was followed by an audience lead Q&A.

Awards
At the 1994 AFI Awards the film won the Samuelson Award for Best Achievement in Cinematography for Nino Gaetano Martinetti, ACS.

References

External links

Exile at Ozmovies

1994 films
1994 drama films
Australian drama films
Films directed by Paul Cox
Films set in Tasmania
Films set in colonial Australia
1990s English-language films